Derwen is a rural village in the south of Denbighshire, Wales. It lies approximately halfway between Corwen and Ruthin, in the upper part of Dyffryn Clwyd on the north side of the River Clwyd, opposite the village of Bryn Saith Marchog.
The population of the community as taken at the 2011 census was 426.

The community includes the village of Clawddnewydd.

An old Celtic Cross stands in the village, near the church, dating from the early middle ages. There is also the Grade II Ffynnon Sara.

Notable residents 
 William Jones (Ehedydd Iâl) (1815–1899), poet and hymnist.
 Charles Evans (mountaineer) (1918-1995)

See also
St Mary's Church, Derwen

References

Denbighshire
Villages in Denbighshire